Allen Thompson may refer to:
Allen and James Thompson (1846–1906), soldiers and Medal of Honor recipients
Allen C. Thompson (1906–1980), U.S. politician
Allen Edwin Thompson (1855–1910), politician in Manitoba, Canada

See also
Allan Thompson (comics), fictional character from The Adventures of Tintin by Hergé
Alan Thompson (disambiguation)